The 2011–12 National League 2 South was the third season (25th overall) of the fourth tier (south) of the English domestic rugby union competitions since the professionalised format of the second division was introduced.  The league system was 4 points for a win, 2 points for a draw and additional bonus points being awarded for scoring 4 or more tries and/or losing within 7 points of the victorious team.  In terms of promotion the league champions would go straight up into National League 1 while the runners up would have a one-game playoff against the runners up from National League 2 North (at the home ground of the club with the superior league record) for the final promotion place. 

Old Albanian, as champions, were promoted to the third tier (2012–13 National League 1) for next season, along with Richmond who finished second, beating the 2011–12 National League 2 North runners up Caldy 20 - 13 after extra time at  the Richmond Athletic Ground.  Relegated teams included Barnes, Hertford (both having stayed in the division for just one season) as well as Westcombe Park, with all teams dropping into National League 3 London & SE due to being from the London area.

Participating teams
Eleven of the teams listed below participated in the 2010–11 National League 2 South season; Launceston and Redruth were relegated from National League 1, Barnes (champions) and Hertford (playoffs) were promoted from National League 3 London & SE while Hartpury College were promoted from National League 3 South West.

Final league table

Results

Round 1

Round 2

Round 3

Round 4

Round 5

Round 6

Round 7

Round 8

Round 9

Round 10

Round 11

Round 12

Round 13

Round 14

Round 15

Round 16

Round 17

Round 18

Round 19

Round 20

Round 21

Round 22

Postponed.  Game rescheduled to 25 February 2012.

Postponed.  Game rescheduled to 25 February 2012.

Postponed.  Game rescheduled to 25 February 2012.

Postponed.  Game rescheduled to 25 February 2012.

Postponed.  Game rescheduled to 25 February 2012.

Round 23

Round 22 (Rescheduled Games)

Rescheduled from 22 February 2012.

Rescheduled from 22 February 2012.

Rescheduled from 22 February 2012.

Rescheduled from 22 February 2012.

Rescheduled from 22 February 2012.

Round 24

Round 25

Round 26

Round 27

Round 28

Round 29

Round 30

Promotion play-off
Each season, the runners-up in the National League 2 South and National League 2 North participate in a play-off for promotion into National League 1.  Richmond were runners-up in the South and would host the game as they had a better record in the league in comparison to the North runners up Caldy.

Total Season Attendances

Individual statistics 

 Note that points scorers includes tries as well as conversions, penalties and drop goals.  Does not include North - South playoff game.

Top Points Scorers

Top Try Scorers

Season records

Team
Largest home win — 68 pts
73 - 5 Worthing Raiders at home to Taunton on 14 April 2012
Largest away win — 39 pts
64 - 25 Hartpury College away to Hertford on 10 September 2011
Most points scored — 80 pts
80 – 31 Worthing Raiders at home to Lydney on 22 October 2011
Most tries in a match — 12
Worthing Raiders at home to Lydney on 22 October 2011
Most conversions in a match — 10
Worthing Raiders at home to Lydney on 22 October 2011
Most penalties in a match — 6 (x2)
Richmond away to Dings Crusaders on 19 November 2011
Westcombe Park away to Dings Crusaders on 14 January 2012
Most drop goals in a match — 1
N/A - multiple teams

Player
Most points in a match — 30
 Matthew McLean for Worthing Raiders at home to Lydney on 22 October 2011
Most tries in a match — 4 (x6)
 Terry Adams for Old Albanian at home to Taunton on 22 October 2011
 Daniel Norton for Hartpury College away to Shelford on 22 October 2011
 Ian Clark for Hartpury College away to Southend Saxons on 3 December 2011
 Mike Allan for Hertford at home to Lydney on 10 December 2011
 Taniela Bakoso for Shelford at home to Dings Crusaders on 21 January 2012
 Peceli Nacamavuto for Shelford at home to Lydney on 25 February 2012
Most conversions in a match — 10
 Matthew McLean for Worthing Raiders at home to Lydney on 22 October 2011
Most penalties in a match — 6 (x2)
 Thomas Platt for Richmond away to Dings Crusaders on 19 November 2011
 Luke Giles for Westcombe Park away to Dings Crusaders on 14 January 2012
Most drop goals in a match — 1
N/A - multiple players

Attendances
Highest — 1,640    
Taunton Titans at home to Redruth on 10 March 2012
Lowest — 40 
Barnes at home to Lydney on 27 August 2011
Highest Average Attendance — 841
Redruth
Lowest Average Attendance — 100
Barnes

See also
 English rugby union system
 Rugby union in England

References

External links
 NCA Rugby

2011–12
2011–12 in English rugby union leagues